Tibouchina duidae is a species of flowering plant in the family Melastomataceae, native to Venezuela. It was first described by Henry A. Gleason in 1952.

References

duidae
Flora of Venezuela
Plants described in 1952